Jane Anne Jayroe-Gamble (born October 30, 1946) is a well known broadcaster, author and public official and former American beauty queen from Laverne, Oklahoma, who was Miss Oklahoma in 1966 and Miss America in 1967. Jayroe worked as an anchor in TV news in Oklahoma City and Dallas-Fort Worth broadcast media markets for 16 years. Later, Governor of Oklahoma Frank Keating appointed her to serve as his Secretary of Tourism and Recreation in his Cabinet. She served in that position from 1999 until 2003. Jayroe has authored numerous articles and books and was spokesman for The Presbyterian Health Foundation.

Early life and education
Jane Anne Jayroe was born on October 30, 1946 to Pete Jayroe and Helene Smith Jayroe in Clinton, Oklahoma. Jayroe grew up in Sentinel and Laverne, Oklahoma.  She has one older sister, Judith Jayroe Wieser Elmore.

Pageantry

As a student at Oklahoma City University, she entered the university’s pageant through her sorority, Alpha Chi Omega, and then went on to win the Miss Oklahoma Pageant. Then, at the age of 19, and with no previous pageant experience, Jane was crowned Miss America 1967.  She sang with and conducted an orchestra for her talent. After being crowned Miss America 1967, she traveled around the world and traveled to Vietnam to entertain America’s troops abroad.

Professional career

News industry
Jane became a well-recognized and respected primetime news anchor for KOCO and KTVY (now KFOR-TV) in Oklahoma City and KXAS in Dallas/Fort Worth.  She won several awards during her 16-year career including the first female to be awarded “Outstanding News Personality” in the Dallas-Fort Worth television market. She also hosted a health-related public affairs show, "Health Matters" on Oklahoma's PBS network, OETA. Jayroe later went on to co-host a popular television show, Discover Oklahoma promoting tourism within the state of Oklahoma.

Health advocacy
In 1992, Jayroe become the first spokesperson for the Oklahoma Health Center and Vice President of the Presbyterian Health Foundation.

Civic work
She was the first woman elected Chairman of the Oklahoma Academy for State Goals and is on executive committees for the University of Oklahoma Breast Health Institute, Oklahoma City University Board of Trustees and the Oklahoma Health Center Foundation. As a member of the United Methodist Church Church of the Servant in Oklahoma City, Jayroe is on the Women's Ministries Team and a board member for the Education and Employment Ministries. She has taken an active role in issues affecting young people, serving as honorary chair for the Conference on Teen Pregnancy, Youth Arts Month and the Oklahoma Parents and Teachers Association. She is a former trustee for the Sarkey's Foundation.

Government service
Governor of Oklahoma George Nigh appointed Jayroe to the Oklahoma Commission on the Status of Women. Governor David Walters appointed her to the Oklahoma Board on Legislative Compensation.

Other honors
Jayroe Gamble was inducted into the Oklahoma Hall of Fame in the state centennial year.  A street in her childhood hometown of Laverne, Oklahoma was renamed in her honor.

Keating Administration
Following his reelection as governor, Frank Keating appointed Jayroe as his Secretary of Tourism and Recreation. In addition to her service as tourism secretary, Keating appointed Jayroe to serve as the Director of the Oklahoma Department of Tourism and Recreation.

Literary work
Jayroe is the author of several articles appearing in McCall's and other publications, such as Out of the Blue, Delight Comes Into Your Life and Chicken Soup for the Mother's Soul. She was producer for "Daily Devotionals," a set of audiocassettes by area ministers and laypeople, and recently created a seminar for women titled "Living Grace-fully." Her most current publications include More Grace Than Glamour: My Life as Miss America and Beyond, and Oklahoma 3, a book published for the Centennial year of Oklahoma’s statehood and portraying the diversity of the state.

Personal life 
She currently resides with her husband, Gerald Gamble, in Oklahoma City.  She has one son, Tyler Jayroe (born 1976).

References

External links
Jane Jayroe Official Website

1947 births
Living people
Heads of Oklahoma state agencies
Miss America 1960s delegates
Miss America Preliminary Talent winners
Miss America winners
Television anchors from Oklahoma City
Oklahoma City University alumni
People from Clinton, Oklahoma
People from Harper County, Oklahoma
Writers from Oklahoma City
People from Washita County, Oklahoma
State cabinet secretaries of Oklahoma
Women in Oklahoma politics
Politicians from Oklahoma City
American women television journalists
20th-century American people
Beauty queen-politicians
21st-century American women